The 2006 Toyota Indy 300 was the first round of the 2006 IndyCar Series season, held on March 26, 2006 on the Homestead-Miami Speedway and covered by ABC. The race was marred by a violent crash in the final practice session. Paul Dana was killed in the crash and teammates Danica Patrick and Buddy Rice withdrew from the race to honor his memory. He was the third driver to lose his life in the IRL. Ed Carpenter who was crashed into by Dana's car was also injured, but recovered.

Qualifying results

Race results

Caution flags
 Caution 1: Laps 10-20 (11) - Smoke: Car 4
 Caution 2: Laps 106-111 (6) - Debris: Turn 4
 Caution 3: Laps 162-168 (7) - Stall: Car 91, Contact: Car 11
 Caution 4: Laps 170-177 (8) - Contact: Car 7 in Turn 1

External links
 Full Weekend Times & Results

Homestead–Miami Indy 300
Toyota Indy 300
Toyota Indy 300